Eri silk (Khasi: Ryndia) is the product of the domesticated silkworm Samia ricini, found mainly in North East India and some part of China and Japan. It was imported to Thailand in 1974. The name "eri" is derived from the Assamese word "era", which means "castor", as the silkworm feeds on castor plants. Another type of eri silk is "Ailanthus silk moth", refers to the host plant, Borkesseu, Ailanthus excelsa, practiced in China. Eri silk is also known as endi or errandi in India. The woolly white silk is often referred to as the fabric of peace when it is processed without killing the silkworm. This process results in a silk called Ahimsa silk. Moths leave the cocoon and then the cocoons are harvested to be spun. The eri silkworm is the only completely domesticated silkworm other than Bombyx mori.

Process

Eri caterpillars eat a number of plants, including Kesseru. In India, it is grown in the states of Meghalaya, Assam, Nagaland, Manipur, Arunachal Pradesh, Bihar, Jharkhand, Chhattisgarh, Odisha, Karnataka, Andhra Pradesh and some small cities in other states. It has been grown in 28 provinces of Thailand since 1974 where the heavy rainfall and humid atmosphere of the region suits the eri culture. The spun threads are often more "cottony" than most Bombyx silks, although some eri yarns can be very soft and shiny. After 30–32 days, the silkworm crawls in search of a comfortable place among the leaves to spin its cocoon.

In Thailand, eri silkworms are fed cassava leaves as well as castor leaves.

Qualities

Eri silk is a staple fiber, unlike other silks, which are continuous filament. The texture of the fabric is coarse, fine, and dense. It is very strong, durable, and elastic. Eri silk is darker and heavier than other silks and blends well with wools and cotton. Due to its thermal properties it is warm in winter and cool in summer.

Uses of eri silk fabric

In India, eri was mostly used for the preparation of winter shawls for men and women. The thermal properties of eri silk makes it a suitable fabric for shawls, jackets, blankets, and bed spreads. Dress materials and baby dresses are also made from eri silk fabric because of its soft texture and moisture absorbent quality. Nowadays very fine (up to 210 Nm) eri spun yarns are available, which enables weaving of very fine clothing, including traditional sari dress materials.

Eri silk is durable and strong and has a typical texture; hence, it is widely used in home furnishing like curtains, bed covers, cushion covers, wall hangings, quilts, etc. Its woolly feel adds to the comfort.

Two eri spun-silk mills have been established in Hindupur in Andhra Pradesh and Kokrajhar in Assam while another is at Chaygaon, near Guwahati, Assam, which is spinning Eri spun-silk yarn with various blends with bamboo, muga silk, and cotton.

Eri silk products are promoted as eco-friendly and natural, and provide jobs and money for the tribal peoples who practice eri culture.

Eri silk production in India during 2007–2008 was 1,530 tons. This made up 73 percent of the total wild silk production of 2,075 tons.

Vegan designer Lucy Tammam uses eri silk in her couture evening and bridal wear collections.

See also
 Meghalaya
 Sericulture
 Assam Silk
 Agriculture in Thailand

References

External links
 Budelman, Joanna. "Did the Silk Route Miss Meghalaya's Eri Silk". May 26, 2019.
 Jayaramiah, Jaishankar (2009 July 20). "Silk Board keen on pvt sector initiative to promote eri silk". Retrieved November 25, 2009.
 Joy, Steena. "Eri silk set to take the fashion world by storm". Retrieved November 25, 2009.
 Muezart, Yarn. "Eri Silk Online Store".

Silk
Silk in India